Ujjain Division is an administrative geographical unit of Madhya Pradesh state of India. Ujjain is the administrative headquarters of the division. , the division consists of the districts of Dewas, Mandsaur, Neemuch, Ratlam, Shajapur, Agar and Ujjain.

References

Divisions of Madhya Pradesh
Government of Ujjain
Year of establishment missing